Crash's Greatest Hits is a greatest hits album by the rockabilly (later country) singer Billy "Crash" Craddock. The album contains rockabilly songs that were recorded between 1957 and 1961. The songs were originally released on the Colonial, Date and Columbia labels. The album was released on the Colonial label in 1986.

Track listing
"Boom Boom Baby"
"Ah, Poor Little Baby"
"I Want That"
"Letter of Love"
"Sweetie Pie"
"Good Time Billy (Is a Happiness Fool)"
"Millionaire"
"Heavenly Love"
"One Last Kiss"
"Don't Destroy Me"
"Is It True or False (That I'm in Love With You)"
"All I Want Is You"
"Well Don't You Know"
"Bird Doggin'"

1986 greatest hits albums
Billy "Crash" Craddock compilation albums